The 2016 United States Senate election in Florida was held November 8, 2016 to elect a member of the United States Senate to represent the State of Florida, concurrently with the 2016 U.S. presidential election, as well as other elections to the United States Senate in other states and elections to the United States House of Representatives and various state and local elections.  The primary elections for both the Republicans and Democrats took place on August 30, 2016.

Incumbent Republican Senator Marco Rubio ran for another term but faced well-funded Republican primary opposition after initially announcing he would not seek re-election to his Senate seat. He had openly considered whether to seek re-election or run for president in 2016. He stated in April 2014 that he would not run for both the Senate and president in 2016, as Florida law prohibits a candidate from simultaneously appearing twice on a ballot, but did not rule out running for either office.

However, in April 2015, Rubio announced that he was running for President and would not seek re-election. Rubio had initially said he would not run for re-election to the Senate even if he dropped out of the GOP presidential primary before he would have to qualify for the 2016 Senate primary ballot, for which the filing deadline was June 24, 2016.

On June 13, 2016, despite his previous statements that he would not run for re-election to his Senate seat, Rubio "seemed to open the door to running for re-election," citing the previous day's mass shooting in Orlando and how "it really gives you pause, to think a little bit about your service to your country and where you can be most useful to your country." On June 22, 2016, Rubio announced that he would seek re-election to the Senate, reversing his pledge not to run.

On August 30, the Republican Party nominated Marco Rubio, and the Democratic Party nominated Representative Patrick Murphy. Rubio won with the largest raw vote total in Florida history (until Donald Trump broke the record in 2020), taking a greater percentage of the popular vote than Republican presidential nominee Donald Trump, who won the state in the election. He is the first Republican Senator from Florida since 1994, and only the second with Connie Mack, to be reelected to a second term. Also, with Mel Martinez's victory in 2004, this marks the first time that Republicans have won one of Florida's Senate seats three times in a row (Mack succeeded Lawton Chiles, a Democrat, and was succeeded by another Democrat, Bill Nelson).

Marco Rubio won 48% of the Hispanic vote and 17% of the African American vote during this election, an exceptional number for a Republican during a presidential year. Additionally, Rubio's raw vote total was the highest vote total for any Republican Senate candidate up until Texas Senator John Cornyn broke it in 2020.

Republican primary

Candidates

Declared 
 Carlos Beruff, real estate developer and chair of the Florida Commission on Healthcare and Hospital Funding
 Ernie Rivera, businessman
 Marco Rubio, incumbent U.S. Senator
 Dwight Young, Pinellas County Sheriff's deputy

Withdrawn 
 Ron DeSantis, U.S. Representative (ran for reelection)
 Mary Elisabeth Godwin, pastor
 David Jolly, U.S. Representative (ran for reelection)
 Carlos Lopez-Cantera, Lieutenant Governor of Florida
 Todd Wilcox, businessman and former CIA case officer

Declined 
 Jeff Atwater, Chief Financial Officer of Florida
 Rick Baker, former mayor of St. Petersburg
 Pam Bondi, Florida Attorney General
 Dan Bongino, radio host, former Secret Service agent,  and nominee for the U.S. Senate from Maryland in 2012 and for MD-06 in 2014 (running for FL-19)
 Vern Buchanan, U.S. Representative (ran for reelection)
 Ben Carson, retired neurosurgeon and former candidate for President in 2016
 Curt Clawson, U.S. Representative
 Randy Fine, businessman
 Anitere Flores, state senator (ran for reelection)
 Don Gaetz, state senator and former State Senate President
 Mike Haridopolos, former President of the Florida Senate and candidate for the U.S. Senate in 2012
 George LeMieux, former U.S. Senator
 Connie Mack IV, former U.S. Representative and nominee for the U.S. Senate in 2012
 Bill McCollum, former Florida Attorney General, former U.S. Representative, nominee for U.S. Senate in 2000, candidate in 2004 and candidate for governor in 2010
 John Mica, U.S. Representative (ran for reelection)
 Jeff Miller, U.S. Representative
 Adam Putnam, Florida Commissioner of Agriculture and former U.S. Representative
 Francis Rooney, former United States Ambassador to the Holy See (ran for U.S. House)
 Tom Rooney, U.S. Representative (ran for reelection)
 Dennis A. Ross, U.S. Representative (ran for reelection)
 Joe Scarborough, cable news personality and former U.S. Representative
 Will Weatherford, former Speaker of the Florida House of Representatives
 Daniel Webster, U.S. Representative
 Allen West, former U.S. Representative
 Ted Yoho, U.S. Representative (ran for reelection)

Endorsements

Polling

Results

Democratic primary

Candidates

Declared 
 Rocky De La Fuente, businessman, candidate for president in 2016, and American Delta Party and Reform Party nominee for president in 2016
 Alan Grayson, U.S. Representative
 Pam Keith, attorney, former Judge Advocate in the U.S. Navy, and daughter of former Ambassador Kenton Keith
 Reginald Luster, attorney
 Patrick Murphy, U.S. Representative

Withdrawn 
 Lateresa Jones, life coach and independent candidate for lieutenant governor in 2014 (running as an Independent)

Declined 
 Bob Buckhorn, Mayor of Tampa
 Kathy Castor, U.S. Representative
 Charlie Crist, former Republican Governor of Florida, independent candidate for the U.S. Senate in 2010 and Democratic nominee for governor in 2014 (running for the U.S. House of Representatives)
 Ted Deutch, U.S. Representative (running for re-election)
 Buddy Dyer, Mayor of Orlando
 Dan Gelber, former Minority Leader of the Florida House of Representatives, former state senator and nominee for Florida Attorney General in 2010
 Andrew Gillum, Mayor of Tallahassee
 Philip Levine, Mayor of Miami Beach
 Debbie Wasserman Schultz, U.S. Representative and former Chair of the Democratic National Committee (running for re-election)

Endorsements

Polling

 * Internal poll for Alan Grayson

Results

Libertarian primary 
On October 1, 2015, Adrian Wyllie and Lynn House, chair and vice chair, respectively, of the Libertarian Party of Florida, resigned their seats in protest after the executive committee refused to oust candidate Augustus Invictus from the party. According to Wyllie, Invictus had defended eugenics, called for a new Civil War, and brutally slaughtered a goat, and is not representative of the Libertarian Party. Invictus has refuted these claims, calling Wyllie's accusations, "deliberate misrepresentation[s]."

Candidates

Declared 
 Augustus S. Invictus, attorney
 Paul Stanton, IT technician and U.S. Army veteran

Declined 
 Roger Stone, political consultant, lobbyist and strategist

Endorsements

Results

Independent

Candidates

Declared 
 Basil Dalack, attorney and former Tequesta Village Councilman
 Lateresa Jones, life coach and candidate for lieutenant governor in 2014
 Anton "Tony" Khoury, businessman
 Steven Machat, music producer
 Bruce Nathan, physical therapist

No party affiliation

Candidates 
Declared
 Bruce Nathan, physical therapist

General election

Debates

Predictions

Polling

with Ron DeSantis

with David Jolly

with Carlos Lopez-Cantera

with Jeff Atwater

with Pam Bondi

with Don Gaetz

with Jeff Miller

with Marco Rubio

with Allen West

with Todd Wilcox

with Carlos Beruff

with Alan Grayson

Results

See also 
 United States Senate elections, 2016

References

External links 
Official campaign websites
 Marco Rubio (R) for Senate
 Patrick Murphy (D) for Senate
 Paul Stanton (L) for Senate
 Tony Khoury (I) for Senate
 Bruce Nathan (Unaffiliated) for Senate

Florida
2016
2016 Florida elections
Marco Rubio